Vidyagauri Nilkanth was an Indian social reformer, educationist, and writer. She was also one of the first two women graduates in Gujarat.

Early life

Vidyagauri Nilkanth was born on 1 June 1876 in Ahmedabad. She was the daughter of a judicial officer, Gopilal Dhruva and Balaben. She was a granddaughter of Bholanath Divetia, a social reformer and poet. She got her primary education (till Class VII) from Raibahadur Maganbhai Girl's High School and completed secondary school education from Anglo-vernacular classes at the Mahalakshmi Teachers Training College. She married Ramanbhai Nilkanth in 1889 and together they wrote many articles, books and jointly edited a magazine, Jnanasudha. Vinodini Nilkanth and Sarojini Mehta were their daughters.

With the support of her husband, she completed her matriculation in 1891 standing the first in Gujarati in the University of Bombay and pursued higher education. She enrolled in 1894 and graduated from Gujarat College with a Bachelor of Arts in moral philosophy and logic in 1901. Her education was interrupted by frequent pregnancies. She was awarded a fellowship and thus her younger sister, Sharda Mehta, and she became the first two women graduates in Gujarat.

Social work
Nilkanth was involved in social work from a young age. She devoted her life for the upliftment of women. She started tailoring classes for poor Muslim women with support from the National Indian Association. She organized adult education classes and various activities for the War Relief Fund during World War I. She was made MBE for her service. She started the Ahmedabad branch of the All India Women's Conference. She also presided over the Lucknow session of the AIWC. She was associated with numerous educational institutions such as the Maganbhai Karamchand Girls’ High School, the Diwalibai Girls’ School, Ranchhodhal Chhotalal Girls’ High School and the Vanita Vishrams which provided secondary education to women who were widows or dropouts from school because of marriage.

She founded Lalshanker Umia Shanker Mahila Pathshala, which was later affiliated to SNDT (Karve) University. She taught English, Psychology and Philosophy in this college.

She was briefly served as a government appointed  member of a committee in the Ahmedabad municipality. She was associated with Prartha Samaj and was Honorary Secretary and then President of the Mahipatram Rupram Anath Ashram, an orphanage.

Literary career 
She contributed to women’s magazines such as Gunsundari, Streebodh, and Sharada. She was the president of the 15th session of the Gujarati Sahitya Parishad. She had also served as a president of Gujarat Vidya Sabha and Gujarat Sahitya Sabha.

She had written several essays with light humour as well as biographical sketches. Foram (1955) includes biographical sketches of his relatives and associates which influenced her. Her other essay collections are: Grihadipika (1931), Narikunj (1956), Gyansudha (1957). Her miscellaneous essays are included in Hasyamandir. She had written biography Pro. Dhondo Keshav Karve (1916).

With her sister Sharda Mehta, she translated Romesh Chunder Dutt’s book, The Lake of Palms (1902) as Sudhasuhasini (1907); and The Maharani of Baroda (Chimnabai II)'s Position of Women in Indian Life (1911) as Hindustanma Streeonu Samajik Sthan (1915).

Awards 
In 1926, she was awarded Kaisar-i-Hind medal.

See also 

 List of Gujarati-language writers

References

1876 births
1958 deaths
Women writers from Gujarat
19th-century Indian women writers
19th-century Indian writers
Indian social reformers
20th-century Indian women writers
Writers from Ahmedabad
Indian women activists
Recipients of the Kaisar-i-Hind Medal
University of Mumbai alumni
Indian essayists
20th-century Indian biographers
Indian women non-fiction writers
Indian translators
Indian social workers
Nilkanth family
19th-century translators
Women biographers